Hans Schaffner (16 December 1908, in Interlaken – 26 November 2004) was a Swiss politician and member of the Swiss Federal Council (1961–1970).

He was elected to the Swiss Federal Council on 15 June 1961 and handed over office on 31 January 1970. He is affiliated to the Free Democratic Party. After receiving a degree in law, he entered the federal civil service as the head of the Division in charge of wartime economy (1941). In 1954, he became Director of the Trade Division of the Economic Affairs Department. With the president of the Board of Trade Reginald Maudling, he was during a meeting of non EEC countries in the Alabama Room in Geneva, one of the initiators of the European Free-Trade Association (EFTA) in December 1958.

During his time in office he headed up the Department of Economic Affairs and was President of the Confederation in 1966. During that year, Switzerland became a member of GATT. He prepared measures in favour of agriculture, a new law about labour relations and measures against inflation. After retirement, he held positions in several Boards of directors (Sandoz, Rieter, Câbleries de Cossonay). He fought for liberal and free-trade values.

References

External links

Eulogy by Jean-Philippe Maitre, President of the National Council 

1908 births
2004 deaths
People from Interlaken
Free Democratic Party of Switzerland politicians
Members of the Federal Council (Switzerland)
Aargau politicians
University of Bern alumni